Daniel "Dannie" Seow (born 2 April 1967) is a former Australian rules footballer who played with Collingwood and Melbourne in the Victorian Football League (VFL).

Biography
Seow is of Chinese descent on his father's side.

A former Melbourne Under 19s player, Seow broke into the seniors in 1986 and played 14 games that year. His season ended prematurely when he was suspended for striking Michael Pickering. He appeared four times in 1987 and spent the following year in the United States, where he trialed as a wide receiver for the University of North Carolina. When he returned to Australia, Melbourne secured his services via the 1989 Pre-season Draft. He made seven appearances for Melbourne, five in 1989 and two in 1990.

Sometime after his football career ended, Seow moved to Shanghai.  He then moved Washington, D.C., where he was player/coach of the D.C. Eagles of the United States Australian Football League.  He now resides in Colorado, where he is head coach of the Centennial Tigers.

References

External links
 Dannie Seow at Demonwiki
 
 

1967 births
Australian rules footballers from Victoria (Australia)
Collingwood Football Club players
Melbourne Football Club players
Montmorency Football Club players
Australian sportspeople of Chinese descent
Living people